Opera Carolina is a professional opera company in Charlotte, North Carolina.  Founded in 1948 by the Charlotte Music Club as the Charlotte Opera Association, the company was renamed Opera Carolina after its 1986 merger with North Carolina Opera which combined the main stage, educational, and touring operations of the two companies.  Its past leadership has included Artistic Directors Richard Marshall and Charles Rosekrans, and General Director James Wright. Since 2000, Opera Carolina has been under the direction of General Director and Principal Conductor James Meena.

Opera Carolina is a member of Opera America and is supported by the Arts & Science Council, the National Endowment for the Arts, and the North Carolina Arts Council. Opera Carolina presents three main stage productions, featuring the Opera Carolina Chorus and the Charlotte Symphony Orchestra, in the Belk Theater in the Blumenthal Performing Arts Center. Opera Carolina also presented an annual concert, Art • Poetry • Music, at the Knight Theater. Opera Carolina's season begins in October and runs until mid April.

Opera Carolina has remained solvent during the recession, which began in 2008, while other opera companies of similar size have closed their doors. The company has achieved this through discontinuing the Love Notes concert, reducing the season to three main productions, reduction in staff, and increased frugality in production costs. Also, Opera Carolina enjoys sustained corporate and private charitable support.

Opera Carolina was among the earliest performing arts companies to give live on-stage performances after closing due to the COVID-19 pandemic.

References

External links
Opera Carolina Official Website
Opera America Official Website
North Carolina Blumenthal Performing Arts Center Official Website
Charlotte Arts & Science Council
North Carolina Arts
The Charlotte Symphony Orchestra

Carolina
Culture of Charlotte, North Carolina
Tourist attractions in Charlotte, North Carolina
Organizations based in Charlotte, North Carolina
Musical groups established in 1948
Performing arts in North Carolina